Major James Armand Meissner (July 20, 1896 – January 16, 1936) was a World War I flying ace credited with eight aerial victories and awarded two Distinguished Service Crosses.

Early life and service

Meissner grew up in Brooklyn, New York and graduated from Erasmus Hall High School there in 1914. He enrolled at Cornell University College of Engineering in Ithaca, New York to study engineering. As a member of the college's corps of cadets, he enlisted in the U.S. Signal Corps as a member of the first class of the School of Military Aeronautics on 17 May 1917.

Combat service
Meissner completed his aeronautic combat training in Tours and was commissioned a 1st lieutenant on 20 November 1917, after which he reported to the 94th Pursuit Squadron commanded by Major John Huffer on 8 March 1918. Among his colleagues in the unit were Eddie Rickenbacker and former members of the Lafayette Escadrille.

Piloting a French-made Nieuport 28, Meissner scored his first aerial victory over the Forêt De La Rappe on 2 May 1918; he was fortunate to survive, given the fabric was shredding off his top wing even as he scored. At any rate, the feat earned the Distinguished Service Cross and the Croix de Guerre. He shot a second plane down near Jaulny on 30 May, colliding with an Albatros fighter in the process.  He then racked up two more victories—one of which he shared with Douglas Campbell—before being made commander of the 147th Pursuit Squadron in July. Now flying a SPAD S.XIII fighter, he scored four more victories, one of which was an observation balloon, and another of which was shared with Ralph O'Neill.

List of victories

See also Aerial victory standards of World War I

Postwar life
Meissner was discharged as a major on 25 March 1919 and returned to Cornell to complete his master's in engineering. After receiving his diploma, Meissner moved to Birmingham, Alabama and began working at Tennessee Coal, Iron and Railroad Company's rail mill. He married Elva Kessler, daughter of a landscape architect from Augusta, Georgia.

In 1919, he and Henry Badham (father of director John Badham) organized the Birmingham Flying Club, nicknamed the "Birmingham Escadrille" and leased a tract of land near Ensley to set up an airfield (Roberts Field). The club was recognized, with the assistance of Alabama's adjutant general Colonel Hartley A. Moon, as the 135th Observation Squadron on 21 January 1922 under Meissner's command. It was Alabama's first Air National Guard unit and the 7th in the United States. Meissner was its first commanding officer.

Meissner died from pneumonia in January 1936. Rickenbacker made the trip to Birmingham to serve as pallbearer during his memorial service, which was capped by a flyover by members of his unit. He was interred at Arlington National Cemetery.

See also

 List of World War I flying aces from the United States

References

Bibliography
 "James Meissner" at The Aerodrome website – accessed March 20, 2010
 Nieuport Aces of World War 1. Franks, Norman. Osprey Publishing, 2000. .
 Over the Front: The Complete Record of the Fighter Aces and Units of the United States and French Air Services, 1914–1918. Grub Street Publishing, 2008.  .

1896 births
1936 deaths
American World War I flying aces
Burials at Arlington National Cemetery
Cornell University College of Engineering alumni
Deaths from pneumonia in Virginia
Military personnel from Birmingham, Alabama
People from Brooklyn
People from Colchester County
Recipients of the Distinguished Service Cross (United States)
Ford National Reliability Air Tour
Erasmus Hall High School alumni
Canadian emigrants to the United States